The 2009–10 Utah Utes men's basketball team represented the University of Utah. They played their home games at the Jon M. Huntsman Center in Salt Lake City, Utah, United States, and were a member of the Mountain West Conference. The Utes were led by third-year head coach Jim Boylen. They finished the season 14–17 (7–9 in Mountain West play) and lost in the quarterfinals of the 2010 Mountain West Conference men's basketball tournament to UNLV.

Roster

Schedule and results 

|-
!colspan=9 style=| Exhibition

|-
!colspan=9 style=| Regular season

|-
!colspan=9 style=| Mountain West tournament

References 

Utah
Utah Utes men's basketball seasons
Utah Utes
Utah Utes